The Treason Act 1746 (20 Geo. 2 c. 30) was an Act of the Parliament of Great Britain. The long title is "An Act for allowing Persons impeached of High Treason, whereby any Corruption of Blood may be made, or for Misprision of such Treason, to make their full Defence by Council."

The Act commenced on 1 June 1747. It entitled anyone impeached by the House of Commons on a charge of high treason or misprision of treason to be defended by up to two "council learned in the law".

It was repealed on 1 January 1968 for England and Wales by the Criminal Law Act 1967. It was repealed for the rest of the United Kingdom on 18 July 1973 by the Statute Law (Repeals) Act 1973.

Other treason-related legislation in the same year
The Act 20 Geo. 2 c. 41 stated that any traitor who had been convicted since 24 June 1745, or who had been attainted by statute before 24 June 1748, was to automatically forfeit all of their property to the Crown, without the need for any further legal procedure whatsoever.
A third Act, Traitors Transported, (20 Geo. 2 c. 46) made it a felony, punishable with death without benefit of clergy, for anyone who had been pardoned for treason and transported to America to return to Great Britain or Ireland, or to go to the dominions of the French or Spanish kings. It was also felony for anyone else to aid and abet a pardoned traitor to commit the same offence, or to correspond with one. However an indictment had to be brought within two years.

See also
High treason in the United Kingdom
Treason Act
Treason Act 1714

Footnote

References

Statutes at Large, vol. XIX, Cambridge 1765.

Great Britain Acts of Parliament 1746
Treason in the United Kingdom
Repealed Great Britain Acts of Parliament